Jorge Alarcón (born 17 January 1969) is a Mexican swimmer. He competed in two events at the 1988 Summer Olympics.

References

External links

1969 births
Living people
Mexican male swimmers
Olympic swimmers of Mexico
Swimmers at the 1988 Summer Olympics
Place of birth missing (living people)